Robert Westerby (3 July 1909 in Hackney, England – 16 November 1968 in Los Angeles County, California, United States), was a writer of novels (published by Arthur Barker of London) and screenwriter for films and television. An amateur boxer in his youth, he wrote many early magazine articles and stories centred around that sport. As a writer of screenplays, he was employed at Disney's Burbank studio from 1961 until his death in 1968.

Westerby's 1937 novel Wide Boys Never Work, a story of the criminal underworld before the Second World War, was the an early published use of the term "wide boy". In 1956 the book was made into the British film Soho Incident (released in the United States as Spin a Dark Web). In 2008 London Books republished Wide Boys Never Work as part of their London Books classics series. Before then, M. Benny had published, in 1936, the novel 'Low Company', (published by 'P. Davies', of London).

His account of his early life was entitled A Magnum for my Mother (1946). To the British public, a magnum just meant a large bottle of champagne.  However, in the USA it could suggest a type of handgun, so it was retitled Champagne for Mother (1947).

Bibliography
Wide Boys Never Work (1937)
Only Pain is Real (1937)
In These Quiet Streets (1938)
French for Funny, and Other Stories (1938)
Polish Gold (1940)
The Small Voice (1940)
Tomorrow Started Yesterday (1940)
Hunger Allows No Choice (1941)
Mad in Pursuit (1945)
A Magnum for my Mother (1946)
Champagne for Mother (1947)
An Awful Lot of Coffee (1950)
Five-Day Crossing (1952)
In the Money (1952)

Partial filmography
Night Beat (1947)
 The White Unicorn (1947)
Woman Hater (1948)
Don't Ever Leave Me (1949)
The Spider and the Fly (1949)
Prelude to Fame (1950)
The Adventurers (1951)
Appointment in London (1953)
South of Algiers (1953)
The Square Ring (1953)
They Who Dare (1954)
Malaga (1954)
 Before I Wake (1955)
War and Peace (1956)
The Surgeon's Knife (1957)
Sea of Sand (1958)
Cone of Silence (1960)
Greyfriars Bobby: The True Story of a Dog (1961)
The Devil's Agent (1962)
Kali Yug: Goddess of Vengeance (1963)
The Three Lives of Thomasina (1963)
The Scarecrow of Romney Marsh (1963)
The Fighting Prince of Donegal (1966)

Television
Disneyland
The Alfred Hitchcock Hour
Sword of Freedom
The Invisible Man

References

External links

London Books: Robert Westerby biography
London Books: Wide Boys Never Work – Robert Westerby (essay review by Martin Knight, 2008)
British Film Institute Robert Westerby

1909 births
1968 deaths
People from the London Borough of Hackney
British expatriates in the United States
British male screenwriters
British writers
20th-century British screenwriters